Michael William Gesicki (born October 3, 1995) is an American football tight end for the New England Patriots of the National Football League (NFL). He played college football at Penn State. He is the record holder for most receptions by a tight end in Penn State history. He was drafted in the second round of the 2018 NFL Draft by the Miami Dolphins.

A resident of the Manahawkin section of Stafford Township, New Jersey, Gesicki was a 2014 graduate of Southern Regional High School, where he set school records in basketball scoring (1,866 points), football catches (103) and receiving yards (1,817) and volleyball blocks (519).

Early years
Gesicki attended Southern Regional High School in Stafford Township, New Jersey where he played football, basketball, and volleyball. He finished his career as the Rams' all-time leading receiver with 1,817 yards on 103 receptions, with 16 touchdown catches.

College career
Gesicki attended and played college football at Penn State from 2014 to 2017. Gesicki was named to the John Mackey Award watchlist in July 2017, which is awarded to College Football's most outstanding tight end.

College statistics

Professional career

The Miami Dolphins selected Gesicki in the second round with the 42nd overall pick in the 2018 NFL Draft. Gesicki was the second tight end to be drafted in 2018. 

On June 18, 2018, the Miami Dolphins signed Gesicki to a four-year, $6.61 million contract that includes $3.66 million guaranteed and a signing bonus of $2.88 million.

In the Dolphins' 2018 season opener against the Tennessee Titans, Gesicki had a reception for 11 yards in his NFL debut. Gesicki finished his rookie season with 22 receptions for 202 receiving yards.

In Week 12 of the 2019 season, Gesicki recorded his first career receiving touchdown on a 11-yard reception from Ryan Fitzpatrick against the Cleveland Browns. In Week 16, against the Cincinnati Bengals, he had six receptions for 82 receiving yards and two receiving touchdowns in the 38–35 overtime victory. Overall, Gesicki finished the 2019 season with 51 receptions for 570 receiving yards and five receiving touchdowns.

In Week 2 of the 2020 season against the Buffalo Bills, Gesicki finished with eight receptions for 130 yards and his first touchdown of the season. It marked the first time in his NFL career with 100+ receiving yards in a single game, but the Dolphins lost the game 28–31. In Week 14, against the Kansas City Chiefs, he had five receptions for 65 receiving yards and two touchdowns in the 33–27 loss. In the 2020 season, Gesicki finished with 53 receptions for 706 receiving yards and six receiving touchdowns.

On March 8, 2022, the Dolphins placed the franchise tag on Gesicki.

New England Patriots
On March 17, 2023, Gesicki signed with the New England Patriots on a one year deal worth up to $9 million.

NFL career statistics

Regular season

References

External links
Twitter
Penn State Nittany Lions bio
Miami Dolphins bio

1995 births
Living people
People from Lakewood Township, New Jersey
People from Stafford Township, New Jersey
Players of American football from New Jersey
Southern Regional High School alumni
Sportspeople from Ocean County, New Jersey
American football tight ends
Penn State Nittany Lions football players
Miami Dolphins players
New England Patriots players